Yearly Departed is a series of year-in-review stand-up comedy streaming television specials featuring solely women performers, created by Bess Kalb. The specials, framed as a series of eulogies at a funeral for the year, have been distributed by Prime Video since 2020.

The first edition was released on December 29, 2020, and featured Phoebe Robinson as host; eulogies delivered by Tiffany Haddish, Rachel Brosnahan, Ziwe Fumudoh, Patti Harrison, Natasha Leggero, Natasha Rothwell, and Sarah Silverman; and a performance of "I Will Remember You" by Christina Aguilera. 

The 2021 edition was released on December 23, 2021, and is hosted by Yvonne Orji, with eulogies delivered by Jane Fonda, X Mayo, Aparna Nancherla, Chelsea Peretti, Dulcé Sloan, and Megan Stalter, and a musical performance by Alessia Cara.

References

Amazon Prime Video original programming